Saen Hai is a tambon (subdistrict) of Wiang Haeng District, in Chiang Mai Province, Thailand. In 2005 it had a population of 3,488 people. The tambon contains five villages.

Toponymy
The word "Saen Hai" literally means "cry hundreds of thousands". Its name comes from "Phra Borom That Saen Hai", a local ancient chedi (indeed, it lies in the adjoining area Mueang Haeng). According to the local legend, King Naresuan rested his armies here and built a pool at the foot of the hill for his use and that of his war elephants. After a while, he died here at the age of 50, when the public acknowledged it, so many hundreds of thousands of people were weeping. However, this story has not yet been officially recognized by historical circle.

Geography
Saen Hai can be considered as a west part of the district. The terrain is shaped like a plow along the length of north to south, with a total area of approximately 22 km2 (13,750 rai).

Adjoining areas are (from the northeast clockwise): Myanmar, Piang Luang in its district, Mueang Haeng and Ban Na Mon of Mueang Haeng in its district.

Administration
The whole area of the tambon is covered by the subdistrict municipality (Thesaban Tambon) Saen Hai (เทศบาลตำบลแสนไห).

The tambon also consists of five administrative mubans (village).

Transportation
Saen Hai is about 5 km (3 mi) from Wiang Haeng District Office via Mae Cha–Piang Luang Road.

Local product
Brown rice

References

External links
Sanhai.go.th

Tambon of Chiang Mai province
Populated places in Chiang Mai province